is a Japanese football player for Kagoshima United FC.

Club statistics
Updated to 23 February 2016.

References

External links

Profile at Kagoshima United FC

1984 births
Living people
Komazawa University alumni
Association football people from Kagoshima Prefecture
Japanese footballers
J2 League players
J3 League players
Japan Football League players
FC Machida Zelvia players
Kagoshima United FC players
Association football midfielders